Chumani Booi (born 15 February 1980) is a former South African rugby union player and currently a coach with the  in Pro14 and head coach of the  in the Currie Cup and in the Rugby Challenge. His regular position is centre, full-back or wing.

Career
He made four appearances for the South Africa Under-21 in 2001 and in 2003, he was called up to the  squad for the 2003 and 2004 Super Rugby seasons, making five appearances.

Towards the end of 2003, however, he left the Bulldogs to join the  instead on a short spell, before joining  in 2004. As a Griquas player, he was also called into the  squad for the 2005 Super 12 season, making ten appearances.

He was named in the Stormers' 2007 Super 14 season squad, but failed to make an appearance.

He is currently an assistant coach at the Southern Kings, who are playing in the Pro14.

References

1980 births
Living people
People from Enoch Mgijima Local Municipality
South African rugby union players
Villager FC players
Border Bulldogs players
Pumas (Currie Cup) players
Sharks (rugby union) players
Western Province (rugby union) players
Stormers players
Griquas (rugby union) players
Lions (United Rugby Championship) players
Rugby union centres
Rugby union players from the Eastern Cape